José Antônio Machado Reguffe (born September 5, 1972) is a Brazilian politician. He has represented Distrito Federal in the Federal Senate from 2015 to 2023. Previously he was a deputy from Distrito Federal from 2011 to 2015. He is a member of Brazil Union (UNIÃO).

References

Living people
1972 births
Members of the Federal Senate (Brazil)
Brazilian journalists
Politicians from Rio de Janeiro (city)
Members of the Chamber of Deputies (Brazil) from the Federal District
Brazil Union politicians